Mawhinney is a Scottish and Northern Irish surname. Notable people with the surname include:

Brian Mawhinney PC (1940–2019), Northern Irish Conservative Party politician
Chuck Mawhinney (born 1949), American who served in the United States Marine Corps as a sniper during the Vietnam War
Gordon Mawhinney (born 1943), former politician in Northern Ireland
Maxine Mawhinney (born 1957), Northern Irish newsreader on BBC News, the BBC's 24-hour rolling news channel
 Paul Mawhinney, founder of Record-Rama, a record and CD store in Pittsburgh, Pennsylvania from the 1990s to 2008
Paul-William Mawhinney, actor, played a lead role in the Australian production of John Logan's play Red in 2011